Anthony Stephen Grabiner, Baron Grabiner, KC (born 21 March 1945) is a British barrister, academic administrator, and life peer. He is head of chambers at One Essex Court, a leading set of commercial barristers in the Temple, and was the Treasurer of Lincoln's Inn for 2013. From 2014 to 2021 he served as the Master of Clare College, Cambridge and, since 2015, he has served as the President of the University of Law. Grabiner was non-executive chairman of Taveta Investments Ltd, the holding company of Sir Philip Green behind Arcadia Group from 2002 to December 2015.

In 1999, he was made a life peer as Baron Grabiner, and sat in the House of Lords on the Labour Party benches. In October 2015, he resigned the Labour whip over the direction the party was taking under Jeremy Corbyn. He sat in the Lords as a non-affiliated member and now crossbench peer, but remains a member of the Labour Party.

Early life
Grabiner was born on 21 March 1945 to Jewish parents, Ralph Grabiner and Freda Cohen. He was educated in the Central Foundation Boys' School. He studied at the London School of Economics and Political Science, where he graduated with a first class honours Bachelor of Laws (LLB) in 1966, and with a Master of Laws (LLM) with distinction one year later. He was further educated in Lincoln's Inn, and was called to the Bar in 1968.

Career
From 1976 to 1981, Grabiner was Standing Junior Counsel to the Department of Trade and the Export Credits Guarantee Department and Junior Counsel to the Crown from 1978 to 1981. Made a Queen's Counsel in 1981, he became a Bencher in 1989, and a Recorder of the Crown Court between 1990 and 1999. Grabiner has been a Deputy High Court Judge since 1994.

Grabiner was non-executive chairman of Arcadia Group from October 2002 to December 2015, of which his first cousin, Ian Grabiner has been chief executive officer (CEO) since October 2009, and chief operating officer (COO) since 2002. He was a non-executive director of Next plc in 2002, and a member of the Bank of England Financial Services Law Committee from 2002 to 2005. 
In the week ending 15 October 2010, Lord Grabiner represented Liverpool Football Club in the London High Court and won two cases against the then current owners of Liverpool Football Club. Lord Grabiner's service to Liverpool Football Club has been noted by international news organisations.

In July 2011, Grabiner was appointed by News Corporation as chairman of the management and standards committee established by the company in the wake of the News International phone hacking scandal. It was subsequently reported in The Lawyer magazine that Grabiner would be receiving a fee of £3,000 an hour for his advice to News Corporation.

Academic career
Grabiner was Chair of the Governors of the London School of Economics from 1998 until 2007. In December 2013, it was announced that he had been elected Master of Clare College, Cambridge University, to succeed Professor Tony Badger in October 2014. On 1 August 2015, Grabiner was appointed as the President of the University of Law.

Political career
On 26 July 1999, Grabiner was created a life peer with the title Baron Grabiner, of Aldwych in the City of Westminster. From 1999 to 2015, he sat in the House of Lords on the Labour Party benches. On 24 October 2015, he announced that he had resigned the Labour whip but would remain a party member. He was the second Labour peer to resign the whip over the views of the new party leader, Jeremy Corbyn. Grabiner explained his resignation to The Times: "I have nothing in common whatever with Mr Corbyn — and I don't believe we are ever going to win an election." He has sat in the Lords as a cross-bench member since 2016.

Taveta Investments
Grabiner was non-executive chairman of Taveta Investments Ltd, the holding company of Sir Philip Green behind Arcadia Group from 2002 to December 2015.

In July 2016, Grabiner was denounced in an official report by Members of Parliament in relationship to his chairmanship of Taveta, for having a "remarkably docile attitude" and representing the "apogee of weak corporate governance". Furthermore, MPs stated that "He was content to provide a veneer of establishment credibility to the group while happily disengaging from the key decisions he had a responsibility to scrutinise. For this deplorable performance he received a considerable salary".

Personal life
Since 1983, Lord Grabiner has been married to Jane Portnoy. They have three sons and one daughter.

Marylebone Cricket Club
Lord Grabiner is a member of the Marylebone Cricket Club. He was a member of the club's Development Committee from which, along with John Major , he resigned over the club's failure to proceed with a development "Masterplan" in 2012.

Other sources

References

External links

1945 births
Living people
People educated at Central Foundation Boys' School
Alumni of the London School of Economics
English Jews
Labour Party (UK) life peers 
Members of Lincoln's Inn
Masters of Clare College, Cambridge
Honorary Fellows of the London School of Economics
Crossbench life peers
Jewish British politicians
Life peers created by Elizabeth II